Licancabur Lake is a crater lake in Chile located on the volcano Licancabur (Región de Antofagasta, Province of El Loa). It is close to the city San Pedro de Atacama and also very close to the border of Chile with Bolivia.

The lake is among several high altitude volcanic lakes in the region. While the waterbody may have overflowed in the past, presently it is only drained by seepage and evaporation.

The lake's waters are clear and slightly saline. Temperature readings recorded at the lake bottom in 2006 suggest it is subject to geothermal heating. The local climate is arid, cold and subject to strong insolation, including strong ultraviolet radiation. This has caused the lake to be compared to the environment of Mars. Despite these conditions, bacteria, archaea, crustaceans and even a midge live in the lake.

Context
Volcanic lakes in the Andes of Bolivia and Chile can be found at high altitude, some close to or exceeding . Such lakes often are poor in nutrients and exposed to strong ultraviolet radiation, partly due to high insolation and partly because their waters tend to be transparent to ultraviolet radiation. Further, the atmosphere at such altitudes is oxygen-poor. These and other environmental properties are similar to the conditions that had existed on Mars. At the end of the last ice age, the Andes became much drier. The NASA High Lakes Project has studied several such lakes.

Licancabur Lake is located on Licancabur, a volcano whose cone dominates the Bolivian-Chilean frontier and the surrounding region. This volcano formed in the late Pleistocene, and is potentially active. Two other lakes, Laguna Blanca and Laguna Verde, can be found at the foot of the volcano. Licancabur was considered a holy mountain by the Atacameno people and climbing it is discouraged. Nevertheless, stone buildings were found by climbers on the crater rim in 1953. Contemporary legend has it that a golden guanaco head can be found in the crater.

Physical properties

The lake was first discovered by climbers in 1953. The lake is at the bottom of the crater of Licancabur, at a depth of  beneath the crater rim. Little dissolved material renders its waters clear. It is one of the highest lakes in the world and one of the highest volcanic lakes; another Andean volcanic lake, Ojos del Salado, is even higher but is poorly known.

According to estimates in 1955, slightly more than half of the lake water leaves the lake through seepage and the rest through evaporation. It is possible in the past that the lake overflowed its southwestern rim through a channel there, when the climate was wetter and water depth reached . This would explain the lack of salt deposits.

Water temperatures are highest at the shore and decrease towards the centre of the lake. At the time of its first discovery, the lake was not frozen. This contrasted with other crater lakes in the region which were usually frozen. Furthermore, night frosts can generate a thin ice cover that thaws in the morning.

The original discoverers of Licancabur Lake considered it to have a low salt content, given that typical salt deposits were missing. The high quantities of aluminum, calcium, iron, magnesium and sodium in the waters of the lake compared to the quantities in springs at the foot of Licancabur may be due to prolonged water-rock interactions. Nitrite, nitrate and phosphate concentrations are small. Chloride and sulfate indicate the input of geothermal liquids into the lake, and degassing was observed in 2006, linked with higher water temperatures in the area of the degassing in the northeastern part of the lake. During 2002-2006, pH values of 8-4-6.9 were measured.

Environmental conditions
Licancabur Lake is exposed to extreme climatic conditions, including low air pressure, strong insolation and strong temperature fluctuations. The climate at Licancabur Lake is arid and strong evaporation is prevalent.

The air pressure is less than half that at sea level. Such warming may be caused by geothermal heat from the volcano.

Most precipitation falls during the so-called "Altiplanic winter" in summer, but winter storms also bring some water to the Licancabur region. Ultraviolet irradiation in 2003 was measured to be . Occasionally, the Antarctic ozone hole influences the Licancabur area. The environment at Licancabur Lake has been compared to that of ancient lakes on Mars, raising interest in its lifeforms. In 2002, a weather station was placed on the shores of the lake to record weather and ultraviolet radiation data.

Biology

In 1981, archeologists discovered that Licancabur Lake hosts plankton. Despite the high ultraviolet radiation, organisms can be found in the radiation-exposed parts of the water column, including at the lake surface at noon.

Owing to the extreme environmental conditions, the biodiversity of high-altitude lakes like Licancabur Lake has been studied. A total dissolved carbon content of  has been found in the lake. The amount of cells found in sediments of the lake increases with the depth of the sediments; archea are only present beneath . Microbial mats containing cyanobacteria have been found on the lake bottom.

Typical bacterial taxa are Actinomycetota, Bacteroidota, and Betaproteobacteria. Overall, at such high lakes only a limited amount of bacterial taxa can be found. The Pseudomonadota and Bacteroidota dominate the community of Licancabur Lake bacteria, something that has also been found in other lakes in similar environments in Tibet and northwest Argentina. There are more bacterial species in the lake than archean ones. Cyanobacteria are mostly taxa which display nitrogen fixing such as Calothrix, Nodularia and Nostoc. There are noticeable differences in the bacterial communities in shallow and deep waters.

Cyanobacterial genomic sequences resemble these of geothermal and cold environments. Most genomic sequences isolated in Licancabur lake have less than 95% similarity to cultured species, with about 37% of all cyanobacteria observed being new species.

Coloured copepods were observed to form swarms in the lake; some in November 2006 were found at the lake surface and others hidden between rocks. Two cladoceran, two ostracod and one testate amoeba species were originally discovered in Licancabur Lake. The zooplankton species identified at Licancabur are widespread in South America, in one case reaching Antarctica.

Animal species that have been identified in Licancabur Lake include the cladoceran crustacean Alona altiplana, the calanoid copepod Boeckella titicacae, alternatively identified as Boeckella gracilipes, the cladoceran Daphniopsis chilensis which may be endemic to the lake, the cladoceran crustacean Pleuroxus fryeri, and the testate amoeba Scutiglypha cabrolae. One species each of a testate amoeba, a chironomid, a rotifer, two species of copepods, and three species of cladocerans were reported in 2009. The larva of the chironomid midge is also the highest find of a chironomid midge, surpassing Tibetan specimens.

Notes

Sources

References
Brush, Charles, "The Licancabur Expedition." Explorers Journal 62(1):4–13, 1984.
Reinhard, Johan, "Sacred Mountains: An Ethnoarchaeological Study of High Andean Ruins."  Mountain Research and Development 5(4):299–317, 1985.
Reinhard, Johan, "High-Altitude Archaeology and Andean Mountain Gods."  American Alpine Journal 25:54–67, 1983.
Barón, Ana Maria and Johan Reinhard, "Expedición Arqueológica al Volcán Licancabur." Revista de Corporación para el Desarrollo de la Ciencia 1(4):31–38, Santiago.
Burton, Kathleen, "NASA SCIENTISTS TO STUDY LAKE'S PRIMITIVE LIFE TO LEARN ABOUT MARS." Oct. 22, 2003, NASA Ames Research Center, Moffett Field, Calif. NASA -

External links

Lakes of Chile
Lakes of Antofagasta Region